Bhabha may refer to:

Bhabha (surname)
Bhabha (crater), on the moon
Bhabha scattering, in quantum electrodynamics
Bhabha Atomic Research Centre

See also
Homi Bhabha National Institute, an Indian deemed university
Homi Bhabha Centre for Science Education, Mumbai, India
Jamshed Bhabha Theater (NCPA), Mumbai, India
Baba (disambiguation)